Mustafa Uğur (born 19 January 1963) is a Turkish football manager and former player.

Coaching career
In 2009 Uğur obtained a UEFA Pro License.

References

1963 births
Living people
People from Kayseri
Turkish footballers
Association football midfielders
Kayseri Erciyesspor footballers
Turkish football managers
Kayseri Erciyesspor managers
Samsunspor managers
Diyarbakırspor managers
Boluspor managers
Karşıyaka S.K. managers
Adana Demirspor managers
Yeni Malatyaspor managers
Kayserispor managers